Royal Aruban Airlines was an airline based in Aruba. It filed for bankruptcy in September 2002.

Code data

IATA code: V5 (originally R8)
ICAO code: RYL
Callsign: Royal Aruban

References

Defunct airlines of Aruba
Defunct airlines of the Netherlands Antilles